John Sherman (1823–1900) was a U.S. politician, serving as a member of the U.S. House Representatives and the U.S. Senate. He later served as the Secretary of State and the Secretary of the Treasury.

John Sherman may also refer to:

John Sherman (businessman), American businessman
John Sherman (cricketer) (1788–1861), English cricketer
John Sherman (climber) (born 1959), American climber
John Sherman (historian) (died 1671), English archdeacon of Salisbury, known as a historian of Jesus College, Cambridge
John Sherman (intelligence), American intelligence official
John Sherman (minister) (1772–1828), American Unitarian pastor
John J. Sherman (born 1967), American bodybuilder
John Sherman, MP for Lewes in 1467
John Sherman, an 1891 novella by W. B. Yeats

See also
John Shearman (1931–2003), English art historian, pronounced as "John Sherman"
Jack Sherman (disambiguation)
John Sherman Cooper (1901–1991), American politician, jurist, and diplomat

Sherman, John